John Michael Skelton (born March 17, 1988) is a former American football quarterback. He played college football at Fordham and was drafted by the Arizona Cardinals in the fifth round of the 2010 NFL Draft. He was also a member of the Cincinnati Bengals, San Francisco 49ers, Tennessee Titans and Montreal Alouettes.

High school career
Skelton attended Burges High School in El Paso, where his father served as an assistant coach. He lettered in football, basketball, baseball, and track. After passing for 2,172 yards and 15 touchdowns as a senior in football, he earned first-team All-District I Class-AAAA and All-City honors, and was named the Offensive MVP by the El Paso Times in 2005. He finished his football career as the starting quarterback in the 2006 El Paso All-Star Game.

In basketball, Skelton earned All-City, All-District and All-Region honors. Changing positions every year in baseball, he earned All-District honors all four years and All-City honors in 2006.

College career
In 2006, midway through his freshman year at Fordham, Skelton won the starting quarterback position and started every game for the rest of his college career. He received Patriot League rookie player of the week honors in that season.

Skelton had a solid first full year as the starting quarterback in 2007, being named 2007 Second-team All-Patriot League in a season in which he threw for 22 touchdowns (the third best single season total in Fordham history). He threw for over 200 yards in seven games in 2007 and for over 300 yards in two games and ranked second in the Patriot League in passing yards per game and total offense. He led the Fordham Rams to a Patriot League championship, earning them a trip to the NCAA FCS playoffs.  In the playoff game against the University of Massachusetts, Skelton set a Patriot League playoff record for touchdowns responsible for at five(5), throwing for 3 and running for 2.

In 2008, Fordham struggled to a 5–6 record, missing the playoffs. However, Skelton put up good numbers for the Fordham Rams with 2,650 yards, and 15 touchdowns with 7 interceptions, finishing the season ranked second in the Patriot League in passing average (236.8 yards/game) and total offense (244.5).

John Skelton's senior year, the 2009 season, was a record-shattering one, with new school records for completions and passing yards.  He led the NCAA FCS in passing yards/game (337.09) and total passing yards (3,708), ranked second in total offense (348.18/yards/game), and ranked third in completions per game (25.82).

Out of the 11 scheduled games, Skelton threw for over 300 yards eight times, 4 times exceeding 400 yards. During his four-year career at Fordham, he completed 802 passes for 9,923 yards and 69 touchdowns, all school records.

In recognition of his accomplishments and strong interest from NFL scouts and teams, Skelton played in the prestigious East-West Shrine Game on January 23, 2010, at the Florida Citrus Bowl in Orlando and participated in the NFL Scouting Combine in February.

Awards and honors
 2006 Patriot League Rookie of the Week 
 2007 Patriot League Offensive Player of the Week
 2007 Patriot League Offensive Player of the Week
 2007 Second-team All-Patriot League selection
 2008 Preseason All American by Consensus Draft Services
 2009 Patriot League Offensive Player of the Week
 2009 Preseason All American by Consensus Draft Services
 2009 College Sporting News National All-Star
 2009 Patriot League Offensive Player of the Week
 2009 ECAC Offensive Player of the Week
 2009 NCAA Championship Subdivision (FCS) National Leader in Passing Yards Per Game
 2009 NCAA Championship Subdivision (FCS) National Leader in Total Passing Yards
 2009 Invited to play in the 4th annual Texas vs. The Nation Game
 2009 Played in the East-West Shrine Game- January 23, 2010
 2009 Accepted invitation to the NFL Scouting Combine

Records
Fordham University school career records:
 Total offense: 10,488
 Touchdown passes: 69
 Passing yards: 9,928
 Pass completions: 802
 Pass attempts: 1363
 Combined touchdowns: 83

Statistics

Source:

Professional career

Arizona Cardinals

2010 season
Skelton was selected by the Arizona Cardinals in the fifth round of the 2010 NFL Draft. He was signed on July 14. After Matt Leinart was released, he was named the third-string quarterback for the Cardinals.

Skelton's first NFL game experience was a 2010 preseason game against the Houston Texans where he led the Cardinals to two touchdown drives in two possessions as Arizona rallied for a victory. He completed five passes out of six attempts for 84 yards and achieved a perfect passer rating of 158.3.

Skelton entered in the fourth quarter of a game against the St. Louis Rams to make his NFL debut, and he completed three of his six passes for 45 yards with a passer rating of 75.0. The Cardinals still failed to win, losing to the Rams 19–6. Skelton was named the starting quarterback thereafter.

In his first career NFL start, Skelton led the Cardinals to a 43–13 victory over the Denver Broncos, snapping a seven-game losing streak for the Cardinals. He completed 15 of his 37 passes with 146 passing yards. He was nominated for Rookie of the Week after this game, but Rob Gronkowski of the New England Patriots wound up winning the award. In Skelton's third NFL start, on Christmas Day, he led the game-winning drive, bringing the Cardinals in field goal range where Jay Feely was able to kick the game winning field goal. The Cardinals won 27-26 against the Dallas Cowboys.

Skelton would lose the last game of the season against the San Francisco 49ers for the Cardinals throwing both a touchdown pass and an interception. He would finish his rookie season with two touchdown passes and two interceptions, a total of 662 passing yards, and a QB rating of 62.3.

2011 season
In 2011, Skelton stepped into the starting quarterback position for an injured Kevin Kolb. He helped end the Cardinals' six-game losing streak in his first game as starter against the St. Louis Rams in week 9, winning 19–13. For the rest of 2011 he threw for 1,913 yards, 11 touchdowns, and 14 interceptions with a quarterback rating of 68.9. Skelton started seven games in total and the team had a 5–2 record during his starts.

2012 season
On August 31, 2012, Skelton was named the starting quarterback for the Cardinals for game one against the Seattle Seahawks on September 9. Shortly after, Skelton lost his job due to an ankle injury in week 1. He started four games following Kolb's injury before being benched in favor of 6th round rookie Ryan Lindley. Skelton started one more game due to poor play from Lindley only before being benched for the season after a four interception performance in a rematch against the Seahawks on week 14. On April 1, 2013, Skelton was released.

Cincinnati Bengals

On April 3, 2013, the Cincinnati Bengals claimed Skelton off waivers. Skelton was waived by the Bengals on August 31, 2013.

San Francisco 49ers
On October 2, 2013, Skelton was signed by the San Francisco 49ers. He was waived on October 9 after the 49ers acquired McLeod Bethel-Thompson.

Tennessee Titans
On November 18, 2013, Skelton was signed by the Tennessee Titans. Skelton was waived by the Titans on December 17, 2013.

Montreal Alouettes
On February 6, 2015, Skelton was signed by the Montreal Alouettes of the Canadian Football League. He was released in May 2015.

NFL career statistics

Personal life
His brother Steve Skelton played tight end for Fordham and practiced with the Arizona Cardinals and Houston Texans but was cut before the regular season and never played in a professional game.

In November 2021, John Skelton qualified for the March 2022 Tempe, Arizona city council race.

References

External links

Fordham Rams bio 
Arizona Cardinals bio 

1988 births
Living people
American football quarterbacks
Canadian football quarterbacks
American players of Canadian football
Arizona Cardinals players
Cincinnati Bengals players
Fordham Rams football players
Montreal Alouettes players
Players of American football from El Paso, Texas
San Francisco 49ers players
Tennessee Titans players